Laorent Shabani (born 19 August 1999) is a Swedish professional footballer who plays for IFK Norrköping, as a midfielder.

Career
Shabani began his career with Malmö FF, moving to IK Sirius for the 2020 season, where he made his professional debut.

He has played for Sweden at under-17 and under-19 youth levels.

References

1999 births
Living people
Swedish footballers
Malmö FF players
IK Sirius Fotboll players
IFK Norrköping players
Allsvenskan players
Association football midfielders
Sweden youth international footballers